= Obshchepit =

Obshchepit (Russian: общепит, IPA: [ɐpɕːɪˈpʲit], abbreviated from общественное питание, "public foodservice", "communal dining") was an industry in the former Soviet Union which handled food service via a system of "public eating establishments": diners, cafeterias, restaurants, etc.

According to the latest All-Union Classification System of the National Economy, obshchepit was under the category "Trade and public foodservice".
